Badminton at the 2015 Southeast Asian Games is held in Singapore Indoor Stadium, in Kallang, Singapore from 10 to 16 June 2015. Seven competitions were held in men and women's singles and in men, women and mixed's doubles and in men and women's team.

Participating nations
A total of 110 athletes from nine nations is competing in badminton at the 2015 Southeast Asian Games:

Competition schedule
The following is the competition schedule for the badminton competitions:

Medalists

Medal standings

References

External links
 

 
Kallang
Badminton tournaments in Singapore